Lucius Antonius (1st century BC) was the younger brother and supporter of Mark Antony, a Roman politician. He was nicknamed Pietas as a young man.

Biography

Early life
Lucius was a son of Marcus Antonius Creticus, son of the rhetorician Marcus Antonius Orator executed by Gaius Marius' supporters in 86 BC, and  Julia, a third cousin of Julius Caesar. Together with his older brothers Mark Antony and Gaius Antonius, he spent his early years roaming through Rome in bad company. Plutarch refers to the untamed life of the youths and their friends, frequenting gambling houses and drinking too much.

Career
Lucius was always a strong supporter of Mark Antony. In 44 BC, the year of Antony's consulship and Julius Caesar's assassination, Lucius, as tribune of the plebs, brought forward a law authorizing Caesar to nominate the chief magistrates during his absence from Rome. After the murder of Caesar, he supported his brother Marcus. He proposed an agrarian law in favor of the people and Caesar's veterans and took part in the operations at Mutina (43 BC). 

In 41 BC, he was consul with Publius Servilius Vatia Isauricus as his senior partner. In this year, he assisted Mark Antony's wife, Fulvia, who was anxious to recall her husband from Cleopatra's court, in the raising of an eight legion army to fight against Octavian's unpopular policies. Later, observing the bitter feelings that had been evoked by the distribution of land among the veterans of Caesar, Antonius and Fulvia changed their attitude and stood forward as the defenders of those who had suffered from its operation. Antonius marched on Rome, drove out Lepidus, and promised the people that the triumvirate would be abolished. On the approach of Octavian, he retired to Perusia in Etruria, where he was besieged by three armies, and compelled to surrender in the winter of 41 BC. The city was destroyed but his life was spared, and he was sent by Octavian to Spain as governor. Nothing is known of the circumstances or date of his death. Cicero, in his Philippics, actuated in great measure by personal animosity, gives a highly unfavorable view of his character.

See also 
 Pietas

References

Citations

Sources
 Appian, Bellum Civile, v. 14 ff.
 Dio Cassius xlviii. 5–14.
 Suetonius, De Vita Caesarum, II, 14–5.

External links

1st-century BC Roman consuls
Antonii
Ancient Roman generals
Family of Mark Antony